The Fiqh Council of North America (originally known as ISNA Fiqh Committee) is an association of Muslims who interpret Islamic law on the North American continent. The FCNA was founded in 1986 with the goal of developing legal methodologies for adopting Islamic law to life in the West.

According to its website, the Fiqh Council traces its origins back to the Religious Affairs Committee of the then Muslim Student Association of the United States and Canada established in the 1960s. In 1980, after the founding of the Islamic Society of North America (ISNA), the Religious Affairs Committee evolved into the Fiqh Committee of the Islamic Society of North America, and was eventually transformed into the Fiqh Council of North America in 1986.

Its 18 members issue religious rulings, resolve disputes, and answer questions relating to the Islamic faith. As outlined in its by-laws, the Council's primary objectives include: "To consider, from a Shari'ah perspective, and offer advice on specific undertakings, transactions, contracts, projects, or proposals, guaranteeing thereby that the dealings of North American Muslims fall within the parameters of what is permitted by the Shari'ah."  The Council's opinions are not binding.

Fatwas 
 Terrorism: In July 2005, the Council issued a fatwa stating that all forms of terrorism against civilians are haram (forbidden under Islamic law), that it is forbidden for Muslims to cooperate with anyone involved in terrorism, and that it is a duty of all Muslims to cooperate with law enforcement to protect civilian lives.
 Divorce: No Muslim marriage can be terminated except through the court system of the state in which the Muslim is resident.
 Capital Punishment:  The Council has issued a fatwa calling for a moratorium on capital punishment in the United States, based on the fact that several of the presupposed requirements for the carrying out of the law, according to Sharia, are not being met in most cases.
 Apostasy: The Council issued a fatwa which declared that apostasy could not, on its own, be the grounds for any fixed punishment, especially capital punishment. The fatwa states: "The preponderance of evidence from both the Qur’an and Sunnah indicates that there is no firm ground for the claim that apostasy is in itself a mandatory fixed punishment Hadd, namely capital punishment"

Executive Committee and members
Executive Committee:
 Muzammil Siddiqi, Chairman
 Zainab Alwani, Vice Chairman
 Zulfiqar Ali Shah, Executive Director
 Mohammed Adam El-Sheikh
 Jamal Badawi
 Ihsan Bagby
 Abdur Rahman Khan
Members:
 Deina Abdelkader 
 Muhammad Akbar
 Zainab Alwani 
 Muneer Fareed 
 Mohammed al-Hanooti 
 Yahya Hendi 
 Yusuf Z. Kavakci 
 Muhammad Qatanani 
 Hassan Qazwini 
 Ahmad Shleibak (updated as of Feb 2016)

Once affiliated to the Sudanese Muslim Brotherhood (1973-1977), Mohammed Adam El-Sheikh was a founding member of the Muslim American Society (MAS), which, in his words, was started by ex-Muslim Brotherhood members who felt that "we should cut relations with the [Brotherhood] abroad and regard ourselves as Americans...[who] don't receive an order from any organization abroad". As of 2004, El-Sheikh was serving as the imam of Dar al-Hijrah Islamic Center, the same Mosque where Anwar al-Awlaki was once an imam. El-Sheikh stated that the mosque's sermons never promote terrorism, and that suicide bombings are never legitimate. Jamal Badawi was mentioned among the unindicted co-conspirators in the Holy Land Foundation for Relief and Development trial, the largest case of terror financing trial in U.S. history.

External links
 Official Web Site
 Educational Addendum: Understanding Your Rights, "Muslim Americans And Shari'ah", by Robert D. Crane, Yusuf Talal and Robert D. Crane, IslamiCity
 U.S. Muslim Scholars Issue Edict Against Terrorism, report by Jason DeRose, NPR, July 28, 2005

References

Islamic organizations based in the United States